Kamarina, Camarina, Kamerina or Camerina may refer to:

Places

Kamarina, Greece, a village in Preveza regional unit, in the region of Epirus
Kamarina, Sicily, an ancient city of Sicily, founded by Syracuse in 599 BC

others

Kamarina (goddess), a female deity of the ancient Greek world.